Hudsonia (goldenheather, poverty grass) is a small genus of three species of flowering plants in the family Cistaceae, native to North America. They are typical of sand dune habitats.

They are evergreen subshrubs growing to 20 cm tall.

See also
Sand dune stabilization

References

Cistaceae
Flora of North America
Malvales genera